Cinemas in Thailand are popular venues for entertainment. Especially in Bangkok, the movie theaters tend to be multiplex facilities offering many other forms of entertainment besides movies, such as bowling or karaoke, along with restaurants and small shops.

The films playing in Thai cinemas are usually first-run Hollywood features, which tend to dominate the box-office scene. There is a burgeoning Thai film industry that is making dozens of films each year that are increasingly popular with local audiences. Films from other Asian countries, such as Korea, Japan and Hong Kong, are popular as well.

The movie-theater business in Thailand is led by the Major Cineplex Group, which owns the Major Cineplex chain as well as the EGV chain and operates the Paragon Cineplex at Siam Paragon as well as Thailand's IMAX theaters. Behind the combined Major Cineplex-EGV, which has a 50 percent market share, the SF Group is the No. 2 operator, with a 35 percent share. Smaller chains include Apex in Bangkok's Siam Square, Thana Cineplex, Major Hollywood and UMG. In Chiang Mai, there is the Vista cinema. In Southern Thailand, there is the Coliseum chain.

, there were 570 screens in Thailand, with 300 in the Bangkok metropolitan area. Nationwide, the person-to-screen ratio is 170 people per screen, with a 30:1 ratio in Bangkok.

Ticketing, seating and customs

Ticket prices range from around 70 baht to 160 baht, depending on the time of day, the day of the week, the location of the theater and the movie being screened. In Bangkok cinemas, the price for new-release films will generally be 140 to 160 baht.

Seating is assigned; audience members make their choice of seating on a computer screen at the box office. Online ticketing is available on theater-chain websites. Automated phone booking is available as well.

Before the film, the audience must stand for the "Royal Anthem", which is accompanied by a montage of images of King Bhumibol Adulyadej.

Most theaters in Thailand keep the air conditioning very cold; patrons often bring a light sweater or jacket.

The EGV chain has "Gold Class" cinemas, which have smaller screening rooms fitted with reclining seats, blankets and pillows. Prices for a Gold Class show range from 300 baht to 500 baht. The Major Cineplex chain offers comparable "Emperor" class seating, while SF Cinema has "First Class" and "VIP" screenings and Major Hollywood has "Star" seats. Paragon Cineplex has "Ultra Screen" theaters. Some cinemas, including Major Cineplex, EGV and Major Hollywood, have sofa-style seating at the back of the auditoriums, intended for couples. Customers who purchase these types of seats may sit in a lounge before the show and may be provided with free drinks or popcorn. Food and drinks may also be ordered and will be served by theater staff as the movie is playing.

Language and subtitling
In central Bangkok and cities with many tourists and foreign residents, such as Chiang Mai, Pattaya and Phuket, foreign films (including Hollywood releases) will have the original soundtrack (called "soundtrack") with Thai subtitles. Outside of tourism centers and in some suburban Bangkok cinemas, all the foreign films, including Hollywood films, will generally be dubbed into Thai language.

Films from other Asian countries, including China, Hong Kong, Japan and Korea, often play in Thailand theaters, but the soundtracks will usually be dubbed into Thai. Exceptions to this will be found at the Apex chain theaters in Siam Square and at House cinema on Royal City Avenue.

Often, films from Hollywood, such as The Da Vinci Code, as well as films from European countries that feature languages other than English, will have only Thai subtitles.

For Thai films, most cinemas in tourism centers will have English subtitles. Exceptions for regional language (like Isan) in Thai film, such as Yam Yasothon (Thai: แหยม ยโสธร) and Panya Raenu (Thai: ปัญญา เรณู), which have only Thai-subtitles.

Film ratings

A motion picture rating system to replace the 1930 Film Code was passed by the National Legislative Assembly in 2007 and was implemented in 2010.

Under the 1930 Film Code, the Board of Censors reviewed all films to be shown in Thailand and made cuts or altered scenes that were deemed inappropriate. The board was made up of members of the Royal Thai Police and Ministry of Culture officials. Members of various interest groups, such as Buddhist monks, physicians or teachers, are sometimes consulted about whether certain films would offend them.

Traditionally, depictions of sex and nudity are dealt with most heavy-handedly, with scenes being cut, pixelated or obscured by petroleum jelly. Profanity and violence are generally left intact.

Apex
The Apex Group of cinemas comprise the Lido, Scala and Siam theaters in Siam Square in Bangkok. The company is owned by the Tansacha family and is headed by Nanta Tansacha. The theaters were built in the late 1960s and have changed little since, making possible a retro movie-going experience that can't be found at the shopping-mall multiplexes. The theaters tend to not be as crowded as the other cinemas in central Bangkok, and it's usually possible to obtain the most-desired seating just minutes before showtime. The Apex cinemas not only show first-run Hollywood films, but also many art films, which is unique in Thailand, other than the House theater on Royal City Avenue. Among the events exclusive to the Apex is the annual Little Big Film Project, in which a series of foreign independent films are shown over the course of several weeks.

Coliseum Multiplex
Coliseum Multiplex is a chain of movie theaters in Southern Thailand.

Major Cineplex Group

Major Cineplex, combined with the EGV chain, is the largest operator of cinemas in Thailand. Its operations are concentrated in Bangkok. Major Cineplex's cinemas are divided into five brands which are Major Cineplex, Major Cinema, Paragon Cineplex, Paradise Cineplex and Esplanade Cineplex.

1. Current Branches

In Bangkok district

In Province district

Major Cinema 
Major Cinema (Old EGV) as the first multiplex cinema operator in Thailand. The No. 2 operator of cinemas, it merged with Major Cineplex in 2004.

Paragon Cineplex 
Paragon Cineplex is located in the Siam Paragon shopping mall, and is operated by the Major Cineplex Group.

Esplanade Cineplex 
Esplanade Cineplex is located in The Esplanade (Bangkok) shopping mall, and is operated by the Major Cineplex Group.

Paradise Cineplex 
Paradise Cineplex is located in the Paradise Park up-scale shopping mall, a former Seri Center on Srinakarin Road and operated by the Major Cineplex Group.

Mega Cineplex 
Mega Cineplex  is located in the Mega Bangna shopping mall, and is operated by the Major Cineplex Group.

Hatyai Cineplex 
Hatyai Cineplex is located in the Central Hatyai shopping mall, and is operated by the Major Cineplex Group.

Quartier CineArt 
Quartier CineArt is located in the EmQuartier (Bangkok) shopping mall, and is operated by the Major Cineplex Group.

WestGate Cineplex 
WestGate Cineplex is located in the CentralPlaza WestGate shopping mall, and is operated by the Major Cineplex Group.

Major Hollywood
Major Hollywood is a small chain of cinemas in suburban Bangkok.

Nevada 
Nevada is a chain in northeastern Thailand.

SF Group

SF Cinema 
SF Cinema is one of the brand names of SF Group. SF Cinema, dubbed SFC is targeted at middle-class families and teenagers. Its location is designed under the theme of Orange and White in relation to its logo and corporate identity system.

SF World Cinema 
SF World Cinema is SF Group's flagship cinema location. It is located within CentralWorld in Bangkok. It caters to a top-end level of customers with services under the concept of "personalized touch" for every type of customers. Opened in January 2007 with a total of 15 screens and 4,121 seats, it is the flagship branch of the SF chain. The cinema is a venue for film premieres and festivals. Centara Grand and Bangkok Convention Centre is adjacent. The cinema also houses a number of digital projectors. The cinema has re-opened in October 2010 after undergoing extreme renovation due to the 2010 Red Shirt Protest and the following mass arson causing the CentralWorld mall to be engulfed in flames.

SFX Cinemas 
SFX Cinemas is SF Group's premium brand of cinemas. The cinemas are tastefully decorated and offer a higher-end level of premium services and an array of latest technologies in cinema presentation such as First Class seating and Dolby three-way sound.

Emprive Cineclub 
Emprive Cineclub is SF Group's exclusive brand of cinemas. It is located within The Emporium, in Bangkok. It caters to a top-end level of customers with services under the concept of "exclusive cinema experience" for top-end type of customers. Opened in February 2015 with a total of 5 screens and 1,200 seats, it is the luxurious branch of the SF chain.

Thana
Thana Cineplex is a chain of small cinemas based in Central and Northern Thailand.

Vista
Vista is a cinema chain based in Chiang Mai.

Others

See also

 List of films shot in Thailand
 List of shopping malls in Thailand
 Bangkok International Film Festival – Held annually.
 Thai Short Film and Video Festival – Held annually; Thailand's longest-running film festival.
 World Film Festival of Bangkok – Held annually in October.

References

External links

Independent listings site
 Cinematic – Movie showtimes for cinemas in Bangkok
 ThaiWorldView - database of Thai movies, actors, actresses, directors and film history
 Wise Kwai's Bangkok Cinema Scene – Reviews and showtimes for mainstream and indie films showing in Bangkok.

Chain and theater sites
Apex chain
Century the Movie Plaza – Showtime listings in Thai.
Chiang Mai Vista
Coliseum Cineplex – Showtimes at Diana Department Store, Hat Yai.
EGV – Showtime listings in Thai.
House – Showtime listings in English and Thai.
IMAX Thailand
Major Cineplex/EGV
Esplanade Cineplex
Paragon Cineplex
Sala Chalermkrung Royal Theatre
SF Cinema City

 
Cinemas
Thail